The Lo Nuestro Award for Regional Mexican Male Artist of the Year  is an award presented annually by American network Univision. The accolade was established to recognize the most talented performers of Latin music. The nominees and winners were originally selected by a voting poll conducted among program directors of Spanish-language radio stations in the United States and also based on chart performance on Billboard Latin music charts, with the results being tabulated and certified by the accounting firm Deloitte. At the present time, the winners are selected by the audience through an online survey. The trophy awarded is shaped in the form of a treble clef.

Prior to 1992, the award was known as Regional Mexican Artist of the Year, until the category was split to form this award and the Regional Mexican Female Artist of the Year award.

The award was first presented to Mexican singer Vicente Fernández in 1992. Mexican performers Marco Antonio Solis and Espinoza Paz hold the record for the most awards with 4 each. Mexican singer Julión Álvarez is the most nominated performer without a win, with five unsuccessful nominations.

Winners and nominees
Listed below are the winners of the award for each year, as well as the other nominees for the majority of the years awarded.

References

Regional Mexican Male Artist of the Year
Regional Mexican musicians
Awards established in 1992